The 2012 FIA GT1 Navarra round was an auto racing event held at the Circuito de Navarra, Los Arcos, Spain on 26–27 May 2012, and was the third round of the 2012 FIA GT1 World Championship season.  It was the third time the FIA GT1 World Championship visited Navarra, with the previous two events being won by a Lamborghini. Reiter Engineering won the 2010 event in a Murciélago and sought to make three Lamborghini victories in the three Navarra races with the Gallardo. Nicky Pastorelli was one of the race winners from 2011 and returned to defend his Navarra win for 2012 with All-Inkl.com Münnich Motorsport. The event was supported by the FIA GT3 European Championship.

Qualifying

Qualifying result
For qualifying, Driver 1 participated in the first and third sessions while Driver 2 participated in only the second session.  The fastest lap for each session is indicated with bold.

Races

Qualifying Race

Championship Race

References

Navarra
FIA GT1